Larreategui is a Basque surname that may refer to people called Larreátegui or Reátegui.

Larreátegui 

 Mauro de Larreátegui y Colón, O.S.B., Archbishop of Guatemala (1703–1711). 
 Andrés de Orbe y Larreategui, Archbishop of Barcelona (1720–1725), Archbishop of Valencia (1725-1736), Grand Inquisitor of Spain (1733-1740).
 José Dionisio Larreátegui, botanist, published about flora from Mexico since late 18th century.

Reátegui
The surname Reátegui is widely spread in the northern Peruvian Amazon region, particularly around Iquitos, Tarapoto, Moyobamba, Rioja, and Lamas. The surname is derived from the Basque Larreategui. The first Reátegui in Peru was Pedro de Larreategui y Gaviria, founder of the city of Lamas in 1656. One of his descendants, Félix de la Rosa Reátegui y Gaviria, founded Santo Toribio de la Nueva Rioja on 22 September 1782, today's town of Rioja in San Martin Region of Peru.

List of people with paternal surname Reátegui
 Reategui, Anthony; professional poker player from Chandler, Arizona, USA.
 Reategui Collazos, Eduardo; current mayor of Santa Rosa District, Rodríguez de Mendoza Province, Amazonas Region, Peru.
 Reátegui Rosselló, Javier Edmundo; (born 28 April 1944 in Lima), a Peruvian economist and politician, ex secretary general of the political party Perú Posible, alumnus of University of the Pacific (Peru), representative for Peru in the Andean Community of Nations.
 Reátegui, Martín; player of the Peruvian football club Hijos de Acosvinchos, Lima since 2010.
 Reategui Rengifo, Narciso; current mayor of Teniente Cesar Lopez Rojas District, Alto Amazonas Province, Loreto Region, Peru.
 Reátegui Flores, Rolando; (born 19 May 1959 in Tarapoto), Peruvian entrepreneur; Fujimorista politician and a member of the Peruvian Congress (2000-2001, 2011-2016).
 Reátegui, Sandra; Gold Medal winner for both 100 m and 200 m sprint at the 1996 South American Youth Championships in Athletics in Asunción, Paraguay and Bronze for 200 m sprint at the 1998 South American Junior Championships in Athletics in Córdoba, Argentina.
 Reátegui Chumbe, Segundo Roger; current mayor of Barranquita District, Lamas Province, San Martin Region, Peru. 
 Reátegui Trigoso, Carlos E.; Peruvian politician, member of the Peruvian Congress (1992-1995, 1995-2000).
 Reategui Gonzalo K.; (born 10 May 1998 in Lima), Member of the US Armed Forces since 2019 (US Navy).

List of people with maternal surname Reátegui
 General Bustamante Reátegui, Víctor; Commander-in-Chief of the Peruvian Army in 2002. 
 Dr. Chávez Reátegui, Wilson; Rector of the Universidad Nacional Mayor de San Marcos (1990-1995), Lima, Peru. 
 Del Castillo Reátegui, Víctor Mardonio; (born 19 June 1958 in Moyobamba), a Peruvian politician, member of the political party APRA, mayor of Moyobamba (2003-2006).
 Maldonado Reátegui, Arturo; a Peruvian politician, member of the Peruvian congress (2001-2006).
 Rivadeneyra Reátegui, Robinson; (born 13 June 1960 in Iquitos), a Peruvian politician; member of the Peruvian congress (2000-2001) and president of the government of Loreto Region (2003-2006).
 Saldaña Reátegui, Miguel Ángel; current mayor of Comas District, Lima, Peru.

In fiction
 Julio Reategui, person in Mario Vargas Llosa's novel The Green House

References

External links

 Petra Reategui (born in 1948 in Karlsruhe), German journalist, writer and translator.

Basque-language surnames